Hay Wood, Whepstead is a  biological Site of Special Scientific Interest west of Whepstead in Suffolk.

This ancient wood on poorly drained boulder clay has coppice trees of small-leaved lime and field maple with an understorey of hazel. Flora include wood spurge, herb Paris, ramsons and early purple orchid.

The site is private land, with no public access.

References

Sites of Special Scientific Interest in Suffolk